Benjamin Lee Sapp, II (born January 20, 1981) is a former American football cornerback. He was signed by the Kansas City Chiefs as an undrafted free agent in 2004. He played college football at Northern Iowa.

Sapp also played for the Miami Dolphins and the Minnesota Vikings.

Early years
Sapp attended Boyd Anderson High School in Fort Lauderdale, Florida and was a student and a letterman in football, wrestling, volleyball, and track and field. In football, as a senior, he was a first-team All-Broward County selection and an All-State Honorable Mention selection. Benny Sapp graduated from Boyd Anderson High School in 2000.

College career
He appeared in 24 games (15 starts) with the Northern Iowa Panthers and 24 games (20 starts) with the Iowa Hawkeyes.  He was removed from the Iowa Hawkeyes squad in 2002 due to charges of violence.  He racked up 78 tackles, six interceptions, 29 passes deflected and four forced fumbles with the Panthers and 104 tackles and three interceptions in two seasons with the Hawkeyes.

Professional career

Kansas City Chiefs
Sapp was signed by the Kansas City Chiefs as an undrafted free agent in 2004. He played for them until 2007.

Minnesota Vikings (first stint)
Sapp signed with the Vikings in 2008. In 2008 he stepped in to the Vikings starting nickel rotation after Charles Gordon went down. In 2008, he had 22 tackles along with 2 interceptions. On March 3, 2009, the Vikings re-signed him to a one-year contract. And re-signed him again for a two-year contract on March 9, 2010.

Miami Dolphins
Sapp was traded from the Vikings on August 25, 2010 to the Miami Dolphins for Greg Camarillo. For the Dolphins Sapp recorded 2 interceptions and had 10 pass deflections in 17 games. On September 12, 2011, during a Monday Night Football game against rival New England Patriots, Sapp was stiff-armed by Patriots WR Wes Welker on a 99-yard touchdown pass. The Dolphins cut Sapp the next day.

Minnesota Vikings (second stint)
After CB Antoine Winfield sustained a season-ending injury, Sapp was signed by the Vikings after a work out.

Personal life
Sapp's high school teammate Asante Samuel also has played in the NFL, most recently for the Atlanta Falcons.

References

External links
Minnesota Vikings bio

1981 births
Living people
Players of American football from Fort Lauderdale, Florida
American football cornerbacks
Iowa Hawkeyes football players
Northern Iowa Panthers football players
Kansas City Chiefs players
Minnesota Vikings players
Miami Dolphins players
Ed Block Courage Award recipients